The World Rugby Coach of the Year is awarded by the World Rugby in the autumn each year. From 2004 to 2007, the award was called the  IRB International Coach of the Year.

List of winners

List of winners by coach, team and nationality

Other World Rugby Awards

Notes

References

External links

Coach
IRB Award
Coaching awards